Ljuba (Serbian Cyrillic: Љуба) is a village located in Syrmia, Vojvodina, Serbia. It is situated in the Šid municipality, in the Syrmia District. The village has a Slovak ethnic majority and its population was 558 people at the 2002 census.

Historical population
1961: 838
1971: 757
1981: 639
1991: 585
2002: 558

See also
List of places in Serbia
List of cities, towns and villages in Vojvodina

References
Slobodan Ćurčić, Broj stanovnika Vojvodine, Novi Sad, 1996.

Populated places in Syrmia
Slovaks of Vojvodina